Muse Communication Co., Ltd. (also known simply as Muse) is a Taiwanese distributor and licensor that specializes in the distribution of anime. Based in Xinzhuang District, New Taipei City, the company also distributes Asian and European films in Taiwan. It has licenses for several popular anime series and tokusatsu such as Attack on Titan, Sword Art Online, Demon Slayer: Kimetsu no Yaiba, JoJo's Bizarre Adventure, Martian Successor Nadesico, One-Punch Man, Re:Zero − Starting Life in Another World, Spy × Family, Saint Seiya, Ultra Series, Kamen Rider Series, Super Sentai and many more.

History
Originally founded in 1987, the company was formerly known as Muse Cultural Enterprise Co., Ltd before becoming Muse Communication Co., Ltd. in 1992. Fukang Enterprise is in charge of physical distribution, while Eagle International Communication handles distribution for live-action films from Asia and Europe. 

Muse Communication (Hong Kong) was founded in November 1997. Muse Animation (Shanghai) was founded in January 2013. On August 7, 2018, Muse Communications began marketing select titles from their library on YouTube in Taiwan.

Muse Communication Singapore (also known as Muse Asia) was founded in March 2019. In June 2019, it launched Muse Asia YouTube channel, which provides anime with English and Chinese subtitles for audiences in parts of Southeast Asia, East Asia and South Asia. The company has since launched localized YouTube channels for audiences in Indonesia, Malaysia, Philippines, Thailand, Vietnam and India. Company has also launched new localised dub channels for audiences in Thailand and Indonesia.

Hakken! is a retail brand operated by Muse Communication Singapore which specializes in anime merchandising. On 16 January 2021, it has launched its first retail store in Plaza Singapura, Singapore. The second store is located inside the VivoCity shopping mall, which is also in Singapore; it opened on 17 July 2021. Hakken! later expanded to Malaysia through Shopee on 21 October 2021 as an online shop.

Distribution

Physical distribution
Muse does not directly release its titles on home video outside of Taiwan but instead sub-licenses to other companies such as Dream Express (DEX), and previously Rose Media and Entertainment for the Thai market.

Digital and television distribution
Muse sub-licenses select titles to OTT platforms and TV stations in other served regions. Notable platforms include Netflix, Disney+, Animax Asia, Aniplus Asia (formerly), iQIYI, CATCHPLAY+, Bilibili, Viu, Tencent Video/WeTV, Sushiroll, Vidio and many more. In 2016, Taiwanese anime streaming service Bahamut Anime Crazy began streaming select anime titles from Muse, marking the first time the company released its catalog of series and films for free on streaming. On 7 August 2018, Muse began distributing full episodes of series on YouTube to combat piracy, starting in Taiwan.

Notable titles

Anime series
86
A Certain Magical Index
Accel World
Anohana: The Flower We Saw That Day
Argonavis from BanG Dream!
Ascendance of a Bookworm
Assassination Classroom
Attack on Titan
BanG Dream!
Battle Game in 5 Seconds
Beast Tamer
Beelzebub
Black Bullet
Bofuri
Cautious Hero: The Hero Is Overpowered but Overly Cautious
Cells at Work!
Classroom of the Elite
Combatants Will Be Dispatched!
Demon Slayer: Kimetsu no Yaiba
Fairy Tail (season 9)
Goblin Slayer
Golden Kamuy
Girlfriend, Girlfriend
Gurren Lagann
Hunter x Hunter
Higehiro
High School Prodigies Have It Easy Even in Another World
Hyouka
Is It Wrong to Try to Pick Up Girls in a Dungeon?
Is the Order a Rabbit?
Isekai Quartet
JoJo's Bizarre Adventure
Junji Ito Collection
Kaguya-sama: Love Is War 
Kuma Kuma Kuma Bear
Love Live!
Lucifer and the Biscuit Hammer 
Made in Abyss
Mob Psycho 100
Mushoku Tensei Jobless Reincarnation
My Dress-Up Darling
My Next Life as a Villainess: All Routes Lead to Doom!
My Roommate Is a Cat
My Senpai Is Annoying
Nekopara
One-Punch Man
Parallel World Pharmacy
Puella Magi Madoka Magica
Rage of Bahamut
Rascal Does Not Dream of Bunny Girl Senpai
Rent-A-Girlfriend
Re:Zero − Starting Life in Another World
Shikimori's Not Just a Cutie
Spy × Family
Sword Art Online
Talentless Nana
Tawawa on Monday
The Detective Is Already Dead
Teasing Master Takagi-san (season 3)
The God of High School
The Seven Deadly Sins
That Time I Got Reincarnated as a Slime
The Familiar of Zero
Tokyo Revengers (Moved to Disney+ from season 2)
Ushio and Tora
Wandering Witch: The Journey of Elaina
Welcome to Demon School! Iruma-kun
WorldEnd

Tokusatsu series
Ultraman (The rights has now carried by Beast Kingdom in Taiwan)
Kamen Rider
Super Sentai
Pretty Cure

References

External links

 
 

 
1992 establishments in Taiwan
Entertainment companies of Taiwan
Home video distributors
Mass media companies established in 1992
Mass media companies of Taiwan
Taiwanese companies established in 1992
Xinzhuang District